Pseudoclanis evestigata is a moth of the family Sphingidae. It is known from Zambia.

References

Pseudoclanis
Moths described in 1955
Insects of the Democratic Republic of the Congo
Moths of Africa